The following is a list of awards and nominations received by Sir Michael Gambon.

In 1998, Gambon was given the title of Knight Bachelor; awarded by the British Government in the 1998 New Year Honours. The investiture by Queen Elizabeth II took place on 17 July 1998. Gambon, despite being Irish, retains British citizenship making the Knighthood substantive rather than honorary. In 1990 he was named Commander of the Order of the British Empire (CBE), awarded by the British Government in the 1990 New Year Honours. and invested by The Prince of Wales.

Gambon made his name on the stage earning thirteen Laurence Olivier Award nominations earning three awards for his performances in A Chorus of Disapproval (1985), A View from the Bridge (1987), and Man of the Moment (1990). He was also nominated for his the Tony Award for Best Actor in a Play for his performance in the Broadway revival of David Hare's Skylight in 1996. Gambon has been nominated for and won four British Academy Television Award for Best Actor for his performances in The Singing Detective (1987), Wives and Daughters (2000), Longitude (2001), and Perfect Strangers (2002). He also was nominated for two Primetime Emmy Awards, and a Golden Globe Award. For his performances in film he received two Screen Actors Guild Awards for Outstanding Ensemble Cast in a Motion Picture for Robert Altman's Gosford Park (2001), and Tom Hooper's The King's Speech (2010).

Major associations

BAFTA Awards

Primetime Emmy Awards

Golden Globe Awards

Screen Actors Guild Awards

Tony Awards

Olivier Awards

Theatre

Drama Desk Awards

Critics' Circle Theatre Awards

Evening Standard Awards

Irish Times Theatre Awards

Theatregoers' Choice Awards

Film and television

Broadcasting Press Guild Awards

Critics' Choice Television Awards

British Independent Film Awards

Irish Film and Television Awards

Royal Television Society Awards

Miscellaneous awards 
Satellite Awards

Saturn Awards

Sitges Film Festival

New York City International Film Festival

Ensemble awards 
Berlin International Film Festival
 2000: Silver Berlin Bear for Best Acting Team, for The Good Shepherd (Won)

Broadcast Film Critics Association Awards
 2011: for Best Acting Ensemble, for The King's Speech (Nominated)
 2005: for Best Acting Ensemble, for The Life Aquatic with Steve Zissou (Nominated)
 2002: for Best Acting Ensemble, for Gosford Park (Won)

Florida Film Critics Circle Awards
 2002: for Best Ensemble Cast, for Gosford Park (Nominated)

IGN Movie Awards
 2011: for Best Ensemble Cast, for Harry Potter and the Deathly Hallows – Part 2 (Nominated)

Online Film Critics Society Awards
 2002: for Best Ensemble, for Gosford Park (Won)

People's Choice Awards
 2011: for Favorite Ensemble Movie Cast, for Harry Potter and the Deathly Hallows – Part 2 (Won)

Phoenix Film Critics Society Awards
 2011: for Best Acting Ensemble, for The King's Speech (Nominated)
 2002: for Best Acting Ensemble, for Gosford Park (Won)

San Diego Film Critics Society Awards
 2011: for Best Ensemble Performance, for Harry Potter and the Deathly Hallows – Part 2 (Won)

Santa Barbara International Film Festival
 2011: for Best Ensemble Cast, for The King's Speech (Won)

Satellite Awards
 2002: for Outstanding Motion Picture Ensemble, for Gosford Park (Won)

Scream Awards
 2011: for Best Ensemble, for Harry Potter and the Deathly Hallows – Part 2 (Nominated)
 2009: for Best Ensemble, for Harry Potter and the Half-Blood Prince (Won)

Theatre World Awards
 1997: for Best Ensemble Performance, for Skylight (Won)

Washington D.C. Area Film Critics Association Awards
 2011: for Best Cast, for Harry Potter and the Deathly Hallows – Part 2 (Nominated)

Honorary degrees
2007: Honorary Degree from the University of Kent on 12 July in Canterbury, England.
2002: Honorary Doctorate of Arts from the University of Greenwich on 8 November in Greenwich, England.
He also had a star on Avenue of Stars, London.

References

External links
 
 Awards for Michael Gambon at the Internet Broadway Database.

Gambon, Michael